The 1935 Norwegian Football Cup was the 34th season of the Norwegian annual knockout football tournament. The tournament was open for all members of NFF, except those from Northern Norway. The final was played at Sarpsborg Stadion in Sarpsborg on 20 October 1935, and Fredrikstad secured their second title with a 4–0 win against local rivals Sarpsborg, who lost their second consecutive cup final.

Rounds and dates
 First round: 4 August
 Second round: 18 August
 Third round: 1 September
 Fourth round: 15 September
 Quarter-finals: 29 September
 Semi-finals: 6 October
 Final: 20 October

First round

|-
|colspan="3" style="background-color:#97DEFF"|Replay

|-
|colspan="3" style="background-color:#97DEFF"|2nd replay

|}

Second round

{{OneLegResult|'Drammens BK||2–2 |Storm}}

|-
|colspan="3" style="background-color:#97DEFF"|Replay|}

Third round

|}

Fourth round

|-
|colspan="3" style="background-color:#97DEFF"|Replay|}

Quarter-finals

|-
|colspan="3" style="background-color:#97DEFF"|Replay''

|}

Semi-finals

|}

Final

See also
1935 in Norwegian football

References

Norwegian Football Cup seasons
Norway
Cup